Hugh Havelock McLean (March 3, 1854 – November 22, 1938) was a Canadian soldier, politician, and the 17th Lieutenant Governor of New Brunswick from 1928 to 1935.

Biography 
Born in Fredericton, New Brunswick, the son of Lauchlan and Sophia LeBrun Duplissie (Marsh) McLean, McLean was educated at the Fredericton Grammar School. He was called to the New Brunswick Bar in 1875 and created a King's Counsel in 1899. He was elected to the House of Commons of Canada for the New Brunswick electoral district of Sunbury—Queen's in the 1908 federal election. A Liberal, he was re-elected in the 1911 federal election and the 1917 federal election for the electoral district of Royal. In 1917, he crossed the floor and sat as a Unionist. From 1928 to 1935, he was the Lieutenant Governor of New Brunswick.

He served with the Canadian Militia and was a captain and adjutant for the 62nd Saint John Fusiliers. He eventually became a lieutenant-colonel and was the commanding officer. From 1903 to 1911, he was the commandant of the 12th Infantry Brigade. From 1911 to 1915, he commanded the 28th New Brunswick Dragoons. He was promoted to colonel and was commander of Canadian Coronation Troops for the coronation of King George V. During World War I, he was appointed officer commanding New Brunswick Troops in April 1915 and in June 1916 he was promoted to brigadier general. He was promoted to major general upon his retirement from the active militia in 1917.

He died in Saint John, New Brunswick in 1938.

Electoral history

References

 
 

1854 births
1938 deaths
Canadian generals
Canadian military personnel of World War I
Canadian Militia officers
Saint John Fusiliers
Canadian King's Counsel
Liberal Party of Canada MPs
Lieutenant Governors of New Brunswick
Members of the House of Commons of Canada from New Brunswick
Politicians from Fredericton
Unionist Party (Canada) MPs